Basilio Ndong Owono Nchama (born 17 January 1999) is an Equatoguinean professional footballer who plays for Liga I club Universitatea Craiova and the Equatorial Guinea national team. Mainly a left back, he can also operate as a left winger.

Club career
Ndong is a Cano Sport Academy product. He began playing for them at Cadete (under-16) level as a left back and then in its Juvenil (under-19) side. He was transitioning to more offensive positions, always on the left side. On 30 January 2018, just a week after concluding his participation with Equatorial Guinea at the 2018 African Nations Championship, he signed a three-and-a-half year contract with Macedonian club FK Shkupi. In September 2021, he moved to Norwegian club Start, on loan from Westerlo. In November 2021, he joined Start permanently, signing a contract until summer 2024.

International career
Ndong made his international debut in a 4–0 victory over South Sudan in a qualification game for the 2017 Africa Cup of Nations. He came on as a substitute for Rubén Belima.

Career statistics

Club

International

References

External links
 Basilio Ndong at CAF

1999 births
Living people
People from Litoral (Equatorial Guinea)
Equatoguinean footballers
Association football fullbacks
Association football wingers
Cano Sport Academy players
FK Shkupi players
K.V.C. Westerlo players
IK Start players
CS Universitatea Craiova players
Macedonian First Football League players
Challenger Pro League players
Norwegian First Division players
Liga I players
Equatorial Guinea international footballers
Equatoguinean expatriate footballers
Equatoguinean expatriate sportspeople in North Macedonia
Expatriate footballers in North Macedonia
Equatoguinean expatriates in Belgium
Expatriate footballers in Belgium
Equatoguinean expatriates in Norway
Expatriate footballers in Norway
Equatoguinean expatriates in Romania
Expatriate footballers in Romania
2021 Africa Cup of Nations players
Equatorial Guinea A' international footballers
2018 African Nations Championship players